Bobo is a monthly Dutch children's magazine published by Blink Publishers. Consisting of comics and stories; it is named after the protagonist Bobo, a nine year old blue rabbit. The magazine runs since 1968 and is originally translated from the English version. Each issue is devoted to one subject. The purpose of the magazine is to educate toddlers and infants in a playful way and it is therefore mainly distributed through primary schools.

Since 2010, Bobo has developed into a cross-media brand. Bobo has its own apps, an educational television series (started in 2011), an online training program to be used on digital schoolboards and smartboards in the classroom, and a complete merchandise line.

Indonesian version 

The Indonesian franchise of Bobo was first published on 14 April 1973. Unlike the Dutch version, the Indonesian version is aimed for school-age kids. Published by Kompas Gramedia Group, Bobo magazine become the most popular kids magazine in Indonesia. The magazine has tagline "teman bermain dan belajar (friend for play and study)". In 1990, the lowercase b in mascot t-shirt has replaced by capital B to distinguish Indonesian mascot with Dutch counterpart, but it changed back to lowercase b fairly quickly.

The magazine in Indonesia has several 'trademark parts'. As of July 2012, it already has:
Cergam (cerita bergambar) (picture stories): Comics without speech bubbles. There are currently three comic series in the Indonesian version: Cergam Bobo; Negeri Dongeng (short of Ceritera dari Negeri Dongeng (Stories From The Land Of Tales)); Paman Kikuk, Husin, & Asta; and Bona gajah kecil berbelalai panjang (Bona the little elephant with long trunk.)
Chosen Stories: A collection of short stories.
FB Friends Story: A collection of stories from reader's suggestions. The stories' plots are decided on the readers' ideas on Facebook. There are currently two titles: Rahasia Hantu (Ghosts' Secret) and Liontin Pusaka Kerajaan Peri (The Heirloom Pendant Of The Fairy Kingdom).
Dear Nirmala, Halamanku, Arena Kecil, Tak Disangka: Dear Nirmala is an advice column in which the readers can send a letter by Facebook to have their questions answered. There are two letters featured each week. Halamanku is a page to show fan art and poems sent by readers. Arena Kecil, Tak Disangka are two specific columns in one page. Arena Kecil (Little Arena) is where readers can tell their fun and memorable experiences, while Tak Disangka (Unexpected) is a place where readers can tell embarrassing and funny experiences.
Kreatif: A page of art suggestions for the reader each week. It has been put there since Kreatif Magazines (by Kompas Gramedia Group) was not published anymore.
Potret Negeriku (The Portrait Of My Nation): Descriptions about specific parts of Indonesia.
Keliling Dunia (Travel Around the World): Similar to Potret Negeriku, but specifies on a place outside Indonesia.
Ensiklo Bobo: Interesting facts from around the world. Usually about science, math, or history.
Sayembara Bobo (Bobo Quiz): A quiz part. Usually in the form of crossword quiz. Readers can deliver the right answer to the publisher to get a chance to win a prize. (usually in the form of money or sponsored items)

There are several yearly events organized by Bobo magazine in Indonesia and is held at Jakarta and Surabaya: Bobo Fair, which has fun activities meant for the readers, and Operet Bobo, which is held every year until it was discontinued and joined with the Bobo Fair.

In 2010, the magazine was completely renewed and in 2012, Bobo magazine Indonesia launched Bobo Online, the Indonesian magazine's official website. In 2016, Bobo Online has been closed and replaced by Kidnesia.com, but later on 14 April 2017, Kidnesia.com shut down and it was replaced back toBobo.id to celebrate Bobo's 44th anniversary in Indonesia.

Kompas Gramedia Group also published Bobo Junior, a preschool kids' magazine with similar content to the Dutch counterpart.

References

External links
Bobo homepage, in Dutch
Bobo homepage, in Indonesian

1968 establishments in the Netherlands
1968 comics debuts
1973 establishments in Indonesia
Biweekly magazines
Children's magazines published in the Netherlands
Comics magazines published in the Netherlands
Dutch-language magazines
Fictional rabbits and hares
Comics about animals
Comics about rabbits and hares
Magazines published in Indonesia
Magazines established in 1968
Magazines established in 1973
Weekly magazines published in the Netherlands
Kompas Gramedia Group